Yuri Hnathovsky (born 17 September 1975) is a Ukrainian retro and jazz performer. His first album Snizhnist was released in 2006, featuring Yulia Lord.

Biography 
Yuri Hnatkovsky was born in Lviv. He finished the Lviv's Politekhnika (Lviv Polytechnic) as a civil engineer.

In 2006, with the help of the concert band of Maria Zankovetska Theatre conducted a charity Christmas music show Snizhnist with intentions to reanimate the Lviv's jazz life, for which it was well known.

Personal life
Hnatovsky is married and has a son Bohdan.

Works
The samples are also available at the official website of Snizhnist.

See also
 Serdtse

References 
 Profile at www.pisni.org.ua
 Snizhnist official website

1975 births
Ukrainian jazz singers
Musicians from Lviv
Living people
21st-century Ukrainian male  singers
Male jazz musicians